State Road 503 (NM 503) is a  state highway in the US state of New Mexico. NM 503's southern terminus is at U.S. Route 84 (US 84) in Pojoaque, and the northern terminus is at NM 76 east of Espanola in Rio Chiquito.

Major intersections

See also

 List of state roads in New Mexico

References

External links

503
Transportation in Santa Fe County, New Mexico
Transportation in Rio Arriba County, New Mexico